Carol Summers (December 26, 1925 – October 27, 2016) was an American printmaker, known for creating works by woodcut process.

Early life and education
Carol Summers was born in 1925 in Kingston, New York.  He received a Bachelor of Arts degree from Bard College in 1951, studying with Stefan Hirsch and Louis Schanker.

Career 
Summers created his prints through a process he developed in the 1950s that became known in as the "Carol Summers technique": soaking large blocks of wood in ink, he placed them in patterns on one side of a piece of paper in order to, as one reviewer described his work, "give beautiful, blurry, shapes to the other side. The results are simple, decorative and uniquely vibrant."

Summers's work is part of the permanent collection of the Art Institute of Chicago, the Brooklyn Museum, the Museum of Modern Art in New York City and the National Gallery of Art in Washington, DC.

In addition to his art, Summers had a career as a teacher, serving as an instructor at Hunter College, the Brooklyn Museum School, Pratt Graphics Center, and Columbia University.

Personal life 
He was a resident of Santa Cruz, California, where he died on October 27, 2016, at the age of 90.

References

External links

Carol Summers' Official Website
Annex Galleries Biography of Carol Summers

American printmakers
Artists from New York (state)
Bard College alumni
Hunter College faculty
Pratt Institute faculty
Columbia University faculty
People from Santa Cruz, California
1925 births
2016 deaths